Elderkin is a surname. Notable persons with the surname include:

 Angus Elderkin (1896 –  1985), Canadian politician
 Edward Elderkin, builder of Edward Elderkin House
 Mark Elderkin (born 1963), American entrepreneur
 Nabil Elderkin, Australian photographer 
 Noble S. Elderkin (1810–1875), American politician
 Paul Elderkin (born 1987), English basketball player
 Susan Elderkin (born 1968), English author
 Thomas Elderkin (1909–1961), English cricketer

Surnames
English-language surnames